Ophichthus menezesi is an eel in the family Ophichthidae (worm/snake eels). It was described by John E. McCosker and Eugenia Brandt Böhlke in 1984. It is a marine, temperate water-dwelling eel which is known from the southwestern Atlantic Ocean.

References

Taxa named by John E. McCosker
Taxa named by Eugenia Brandt Böhlke
Fish described in 1984
menezesi